Mary Ball may refer to

 Mary Ball (naturalist) (1812–1898), Irish naturalist and entomologist
 Mary Ball (poisoner) (1818–1849), English housewife who poisoned her husband
 Mary Ball Washington (1707–1789), mother of U.S. president George Washington
, Liberty ship named after Mary Ball Washington